Sinclair Township is a township in Jewell County, Kansas, USA.  As of the 2000 census, its population was 67.

Geography
Sinclair Township covers an area of 35.34 square miles (91.52 square kilometers); of this, 0.99 square miles (2.57 square kilometers) or 2.81 percent is water.

Unincorporated towns
 Lovewell
(This list is based on USGS data and may include former settlements.)

Adjacent townships
 Jackson Township (north)
 Big Bend Township, Republic County (northeast)
 White Rock Township, Republic County (east)
 Courtland Township, Republic County (southeast)
 Grant Township (south)
 Washington Township (southwest)
 Richland Township (west)
 Montana Township (northwest)

Cemeteries
The township contains three cemeteries: Fairview, Laurel Hill and Switzers Gap.

References
 U.S. Board on Geographic Names (GNIS)
 United States Census Bureau cartographic boundary files

External links
 US-Counties.com
 City-Data.com

Townships in Jewell County, Kansas
Townships in Kansas